"All the Things She Said" is a song recorded by Russian music duo t.A.T.u. for their second, and first English-language, studio album 200 km/h in the Wrong Lane (2002), and released as the lead single from the album in Europe on 9 September 2002 by Universal. It was written by Sergio Galoyan, Trevor Horn, Martin Kierszenbaum, Valery Polienko and Elena Kiper, while production was by Horn. "All the Things She Said" is a translated and reworked version of their 2000 song "", included on their debut album 200 Po Vstrechnoy (2001). It was later included on their compilation albums t.A.T.u. Remixes (2003) and The Best (2006). Although its original story was based on a dream Kiper had at a dentist appointment, manager Ivan Shapovalov evoked the theme of lesbianism in both this and the English-language version. Lyrically, it focuses on two girls developing feelings for each other.

"All the Things She Said" received mixed reviews from music critics: while some commended the production and lyrical content, others called it a gimmick and suggestive. "All the Things She Said" reached number one in several countries around the world, including Australia, Austria, France, New Zealand, Switzerland and the United Kingdom. It also reached number 20 on the US Billboard Hot 100, the first Russian act to have a top 40 single and the highest placing for a Russian act to date. Shapovalov commissioned the accompanying music video for the single, which shows the group behind a fence in school uniforms, trying to escape.

The music video caused considerable controversy in several nations because it represented lesbian girls. Several organisations protested against the video and sought to ban it, while some music stations removed the scenes featuring the girls kissing. The song has been performed many times, including on many TV shows, along with a megamix version with "Not Gonna Get Us" at the 2003 MTV Movie Awards. It was also the first Russian music video on YouTube to receive a Vevo Certified Award for reaching 100 million views in June 2016.

Background
Yulia Volkova and Lena Katina auditioned in a children's group named Neposedy. However, Volkova was removed from the group a year later. Russian tabloids believed her removal was based on misbehavior and disrupting other members by stripping, smoking, drinking alcohol and swearing, but Neposedy denied this. Russian producers Ivan Shapovalov and Alexander Voitinskiy held an audition for two teenage girls, where Volkova and Katina auditioned and won the part. Despite knowing each other, both girls did not know the other was auditioning. For their Russian debut in 1999, Shapolavov named the duo Тату ("Tatu"). The name comes from the English word "Tattoo".

During their first sessions, Voitinskiy left the project. Shapovalov hired Elena Kiper to co-write and co-produce the music of Taty. Together, they wrote "". The duo, alongside several other Russian producers and songwriters, completed the group's first album 200 Po Vstrechnoy. The album was a large success in Europe, selling over one million units. Shapovalov persisted in trying to sign the group with an international label, visiting North America and meeting with several record companies. He eventually settled a deal with a Russian division of Universal Music Group and Interscope Records.

Composition
"All the Things She Said" was written by Sergio Galoyan, Trevor Horn, Martin Kierszenbaum, Valery Polienko and Elena Kiper, while production was by Horn. The song was mixed and recorded by Robert Orton at UMG Studios in Santa Monica, California.

According to the sheet music published at Musicnotes.com by Universal Music Publishing Group, the song is composed in the key of F minor with a time signature in common time, and a moderate groove of 90 beats per minute. Both Volkova and Katina's vocal range is spread between F4 and D♭5. The composition is built on two main live instruments; piano and electric guitar. The first verse has Volkova and Katina "whisper their desires and then blow up the chorus with enough teen confusion and angst to fill up a week of Hollyoaks". Lyrically, the song discusses difficulty in teenagers allowing to express their sexuality. Katina commented "We're singing about love [...] Even all over the world teenagers, can find themselves in our song[s] 'cause we're singing about these problems, we're singing about teenagers, and I think everybody can understand that".

Based on both the English and Russian versions, the song was conceived when Kiper had a dentist appointment. She fell asleep while having surgery and dreamed about kissing another woman. She woke up saying "" After discussing this with Shapovalov, he started to write the second phrase, "". Shapovalov decided to carry on the concept of lesbianism through the English version. Shapovalov had been accused by Russian media for taking the idea of Kiper and conveying it as his own, whilst Kiper stated that the idea was all thought by herself. "" was written by Sergio Galoyan, Kiper and Valeriy Polienko, whilst production was handled by the group's manager, Shapovalov. He also composed the track, and it was recorded by him at the Neformat Studios, Russia in the early 2000.

Two versions of the single were released: the original version that appears on 200 Po Vstrechnoy, with a more dance/electro composition; and the reworked, pop-rock version (used for "All The Things She Said") appearing on 200 km/h in the Wrong Lane (2002).

Release
After the completion of the song, the co-manager of the group, Boris Renski, decided to pull the release as he felt the final result would be a failure and not achieve success with the Russian public. Shapovalov persuaded Renski in allowing the continuation of the band, and offered to pay for the music video himself; Renski accepted the offer. The recording premiered on 19 December 2000 as the lead single from the album. It was released as a CD single which included the original version, four remix versions, and two enhanced videos (the visual and behind-the-scenes footage). A cassette tape was also issued in Russia, and featured the five tracks from the CD single. After the group signed a contract with Universal Music Russia in 2001, "" was re-distributed as a double A-side single with their song, "Nas Ne Dagonyat" (2001), in Poland. That same year, it was sent to radio stations in Germany and Europe. In January 2003, it appeared as a  second B-side track on the physical release of "All The Things She Said".

Critical reception
Both the original and English-language version received mixed reviews. Writing for AllMusic, Drago Bonacich selected the track as one of the group's best work. Sean Bertiger from Popdirt.com preferred the Russian version over the English adaption, citing the band's vocals and emotions as factors to his opinion. Since its release, the song has achieved accolades and awards. In early 2001, Universal Music Group hosted a poll for the audience to vote on which song was the best from 200 Po Vstrechnoy; as a result, "" came first place. That same year, "" won the 100 Pound Hit awarded by Hit FM Russia, with t.A.T.u. as well performing the track the same night. On 29 November 2005, Kiper was presented the Songwriting Award at the BMI Honors Top European Songwriters And Publishers; this was her first win at the ceremony, and went on winning the second time with "Not Gonna Get Us" (2002), t.A.T.u.'s second international single. Commercially, the single reached number one on the Russian Singles Chart, charting there for eighteen consecutive weeks. By January 2010, "" sold over 50,000 units and over 200,000 illegal copies.

Cash Box praised "Jim Kerr's impassioned vocal and the band's swirling, anthemic sound."  Billboard said it is "of a piece with the band's other post-pop-breakthrough material".

Erlewine felt the song was a "gimmick" and "suggestive", but highlighted the song as an album standout. PopMatters called complaints about the song "ridiculous" and added that they do not care if they are "transgender, bisexual, lesbian or gay. In the end, it's about people and yourself feeling safe and better together". Bill Lamb from About.com had prospects for the song, feeling his view was "irrefutable". Rebecca Bary from The New Zealand Herald said "Think 'Baby One More Time' spliced with 'Dirrty' and you have the biggest one-hit wonder of the year." She continued, saying "When these obnoxious, school-uniformed Russian maybe-lesbians poured their squirrelly hearts out over a repetitive dance beat, you can't deny it worked.".

The song was ranked at number 452 in Blender magazine's The 500 Greatest Songs Since You Were Born. The song was listed at number 8 on the AOLs Top 100 Pop Songs of the Decade. Bill Lamb from About.com listed the song on his Top 100 Pop Songs of 2003 at number 31. He also listed it on his Top 10 Contemporary Girl Group Songs at number ten. Stephanie Theobald from The Guardian called it one of her favorite lesbian songs.

The song was ranked at the top spot on the Australian Top 50 Lesbian songs, which was voted by users. AfterEllen.com criticized the song for being at the top spot, exclaiming; "There are so many better songs than that – my mind is blown... I guess it's one of the easier ones to think of in this new generation of lesbians... I just hope they can open up their ears more and discover so many other amazing (really queer) musicians." Though notified as a Gay and Lesbian anthem, Mia Jones from AfterEllen.com did not add the song, because "she is still not a fan".

Commercial performance
A high demand for imports of "All the Things She Said" in the UK caused it to debut at number 57 on the UK Singles Chart. It rose to number 44 and ascended to the top of the charts the following week after its official release, making t.A.T.u. the first Russian act to reach number one in the UK. The song spent four weeks at one on the UK Singles Chart and remained in the charts for 15 weeks, earning a platinum certification from the British Phonographic Industry (BPI), selling more than 600,000 copies. As of February 2018, the track has 529,000 combined sales to its name, including 6.7 streams since 2014. It also reached number one on the Irish Singles Chart for four consecutive weeks. The song peaked at number one in several European countries, including Austria, Denmark, Germany, Italy, Romania, and Spain. The song spent four consecutive weeks at number one on the Italian Singles Chart and stayed in the charts for 16 weeks.

On 23 March 2003, the song debuted at number one on the Australian Singles Chart and stayed at number one for two non-consecutive weeks. The song remained in the chart for 11 weeks and was certified platinum by the Australian Recording Industry Association (ARIA). "All the Things She Said" debuted at number 49 on the New Zealand Singles Chart and reached number one five weeks later. It was certified gold by Recorded Music NZ for shipments of 7,500 units. In the US, the song peaked at number 20 on the Billboard Hot 100 chart. This is the group's only single to chart on the Hot 100, as well as being the highest-charting song by a Russian act in the US.

Music video
Background and synopsis

The song is well known for its controversial music video, which was directed by t.A.T.u's producer, writer and director Ivan Shapovalov, and was shot at the Khodynka Field in Moscow between 4 and 7 September 2000. Preparation for the visual consisted of both Volkova and Katina covering themselves in dark-tanning lotion and getting haircuts. Over 90 people were present on set, including extra actors, whilst some members had designed a large brick wall by painting abstract patterns and colors to it. According to Shapovalov, the wall itself cost approximately $3000 USD. After shooting the majority of the scenes in Khodynka Field, Shapovalov moved the wall and iron fence to Kutuzov Avenue, Moscow, in order to shoot frames of traffic until the camera changed its focus on the girls again. Shapovalov stated that he wanted the viewers to know that there was a "world behind the crowd of people". The video was broadcast in Russia and Europe in early December 2000 on MTV.

The music video opens with a panning view of a fence and people with umbrellas on the left, eventually zooming out on an audience looking through it in the rain. Both Volkova and Katina are then shown singing to the track in Catholic school uniforms. Throughout the majority of the visual, the girls are featured performing erratic behaviour, which includes them banging against a fence, yelling for help towards the audience, and occasionally laughing at them. While continuing to sing to each other during the second chorus, they subsequently start to kiss, and the audience slightly stares at their actions. Following this, several members of the public start to talk to each other, whilst a shot with the camera looking up Volkova's skirt and exposing her underwear is shown during the process.

The bridge section has the girls lying in water while snow starts to fall. At the last portion of the chorus, t.A.T.u. are portrayed pointing in different directions, until they both walk around corner and see a vast field, where the sun is breaking out of the clouds; they clasp hands and walk off into the distance. The people on the other side of the fence are left in an eerie green light with rain falling steadily; it is also revealed that they are the ones isolated behind the fence. The video's final scene shows the girls walking further in the distance. Several frames from "" did not appear in the visual for "All the Things She Said" due to lip-syncing issues. Like "All the Things She Said", the video generated controversy for having the duo kissing, with critics particularly believing that it prompted pedophilia and lesbianism. An editor from The Age commented that the impact of the video for "" was generally lukewarm.

The music video won the MTV Video Music Award among the Russian nominees of 2000, marking the group's first nomination and win at the ceremony. Despite this, it caused controversy in Russia similarly to the cultural impact of "All The Things She Said". This resulted in the clip being banned on MTV Russia due to depictions of lesbianism and support for gay rights; a censored version was edited by Shapovalov, omitting any sexual references. According to Jon Kutner, writing in his book 1000 UK Number One Hits, the idea of school girls behind an iron fence courted controversy nevertheless. A member of The Advocate labelled the girls in the videos as "underage porn-quality lolitas", and noted it garnered huge media coverage in Russia alongside commercial sales.

Remix versions
An official video for the remix version produced by HarDrum was included on the CD format of the single; it included unreleased footage that did not appear on the original version, featuring different angle shots of the girls, expressions from the public's faces and the band performing erratically. It also included various scenes of people on-set helping with the music video's production, and one holding the wired fence. In July and September 2015, the group uploaded two teaser videos of a remix version produced by Fly Dream in order to commemorate the single's 15th anniversary on 19 December that same year; by then, it still remained unreleased. On 7 August 2016, one year since the two trailers, t.A.T.u. uploaded an HD version of the video with new unreleased scenes and extended footage. Lasting five minutes and 37 seconds, it showed an extended cut of the girls arguing next to the brick wall and walking around the corner to find the vast Khodynka Field with a clearer cityscape in the distance by the fourth minute. The ending of the video portrays t.A.T.u. in the distance, similar to the original video.

Promotion
"" was included on the group's 200 Po Vstrechnoy concert tour, where they performed in Russia and Ukraine; they extended the tour in 2002 and traveled to Germany, the Czech Republic, and Poland among others. Parts of "" were used during t.A.T.u.'s Truth Tour in  St. Petersburg, where it served as the concert's closing number. The single was additionally included on the group's greatest hits compilation album The Best (2006), while the music video and HarDrum remix and video version were included on the former album and their 2003 t.A.T.u. Remixes album. Russian singer Elena Temnikova performed a version of the track with another female artist for a Russian television show while impersonating band member Volkova.

Controversy
The video caused controversy in countries where it was played. In Canada, it was listed on MuchMusic's 50 Most Controversial Videos at number four. It was listed on FHM Music TV on their Most Sexy Videos at number five. Virgin Media included the song on their list of  "Sexiest Music Videos Ever". Standard.co.uk listed the song at two on their top Sexiest Music Videos Ever. Clare Simpson from WhatCulture! listed the music video at number six on their 12 Raunchiest Music Videos ever. She said "I remember when this video came out and being totally fascinated by it – the rampant portrayal of lipstick lesbianism on the music television channels during the day time." In 2011, MSN called it the most controversial music video. Urban Garden Magazine listed the video on their Most Controversial Music Videos of All Time. The American magazine FHM ranked the video number thirty on their Sexiest Videos of All Time, saying "This video caused uproar across the world" and that the kissing scene was the highlight of the video. Ugo.com also ranked the video at thirty-eight on their Sexiest Videos of All Time. Fuse TV ranked the video at sixty-four on their "Top 100 Sexiest Music Videos of All Time".

After its worldwide release, the song received media attention worldwide. In the United Kingdom, ITV banned the video from its music show CD:UK, as producer Tammy Hoyle responded "We could not show the video on CD:UK because it is not really suitable for children." Meanwhile, fellow ITV personalities Richard and Judy campaigned to have the video banned from general British television, claiming it pandered to pedophiles with the use of school uniforms and young girls kissing. However, the campaign failed. The BBC denied that they banned the video from its weekly BBC One music show Top of the Pops. MuchMusic had apparent thoughts of banning the music video from airing, but this decision was ultimately scrapped. According to the president of the show, Craig Halket said "We felt that it didn't oversexualize them and they looked of age, (they were 15 at the time) I can see the controversy. It's like many videos, including the Christina Aguilera video -- it pushes buttons."

The music video was the subject of much criticism throughout t.A.T.u.'s career. The AllMusic review for 200 km/h in the Wrong Lane labelled the band as a tawdry gimmick. A writer from The Daily Telegraph expressed the video as "clichéd", while it titillating on a very base and adolescent level, only serves to cheapen the song's lyrical impact. The video is also a sign of how blurred the line between entertainment and exploitation has become.

Three years after the release of the single, Volkova announced her pregnancy. This led to accusations of the girls being "fake", in giving the impression that they were lesbians, although Julia and Lena have said in the past they are not "together" nor "in a relationship". Additionally, in 2014, Julia stated that she would "not support a gay son" despite promoting the image of a lesbian relationship.

Similarity to Katy Perry's "E.T."
In February 2011, US singer Katy Perry released her single "E.T." from her third studio album, Teenage Dream (2010). According to several music publications, the composition and rhythm bar of Perry's single was similar to the sound of ""; Matthew Cole from Slant Magazine disliked Perry's song for being "inscrutable" and explained that its backing track was reminiscent of t.A.T.u.'s song. Similarly, The A.V. Club editor Genevieve Koski felt "E.T." "bears more than a passing resemblance" of t.A.T.u.'s single, and a reporter from Sound Magazine posted a mash-up version of the songs to distinguish the comparisons; the website labelled it one of the most "annoyingly addictive" songs. In May 2011, Galoyan responded to the comparisons and criticized Perry's track, considering legal action against the singer, featured hip-hop artist Kanye West, and her labels Capitol Records and Universal Music Group, but not responding since his comments.

Modern usage and legacy

The song has appeared in multiple television events. It was WWE professional wrestler Victoria's theme song from 15 December 2002 (at WWE's Armageddon pay-per-view, where she debuted it) to May 2004 with the song starting from "Yes, I've lost my mind". Also, the song was played during the final scenes of the Birds of Prey series on the WB network, in the 2003 episode "Devil's Eyes". This theme was also featured as the opening song of the Chinese drama, Legend of the Heavenly Stones, as a Chinese language dub.

The song was parodied on the Australian sketch show Comedy Inc.. The video was also parodied on The Frank Skinner Show with Skinner playing Volkova and Jennie McAlpine playing Katina. Leigh Francis parodied the video in the second series of his comedy program Bo' Selecta!

In an interview with The Independent, Yulia claimed that the song had helped people to be honest about their sexual orientations. She said "People used to call us and say 'Thank you. That helped us to come out, [...] You helped us to feel like people.'" She then said "It was our teenage years, [...] You have to try everything. It felt at the time like it was real love – it felt like there was nothing more serious... Now when you look back at it, of course, it's ridiculous."

The song features as the theme song for the  Red Scare podcast.

On 12 November 2012, the song was covered by the French alternative rock band Halflives and featured Mercedes from the Canadian rock band Courage My Love via YouTube.

A cover of the song by American singer Poppy was released on 3 June 2020.

The song has also been covered by virtual artist and League of Legends character, Seraphine and released on 25 September 2020. The cover was part of the Riot Games music initiative, following the success of the virtual band K/DA and hip hop group True Damage.

The song was covered by Australian extreme metal band The Berzerker.

Live performances
t.A.T.u. performed the song on many television shows in the United States. They first appeared on The Tonight Show with Jay Leno, where the girls created confusion, because they kissed each other without first having been granted permission to do so. They performed the single on Jimmy Kimmel Live!, at AOL, on Mad TV, the Carson Daly Show, Total Request Live and the 2003 MTV Movie Awards.

Track listingsEuropean CD single (2002) and UK cassette single "All the Things She Said" (radio version)
 "Stars"European CD single (2003) "All the Things She Said" (radio version)
 "Stars"
 "All the Things She Said" (Extension 119 club vocal mix)
 "Ya Soshla s Uma"European 12-inch singleA1. "All the Things She Said" (DJ Monk's After Skool Special) – 7:03
A2. "All the Things She Said" (Running and Spinning mix) – 6:13
B1. "All the Things She Said" (Extension 119 club vocal) – 8:30
B2. "All the Things She Said" (original version extended mix) – 5:37UK CD single "All the Things She Said" (radio version)
 "All the Things She Said" (Extension 119 club edit)
 "Stars"
 "All the Things She Said" (CD-ROM video)US CD single "All the Things She Said" (radio version) – 3:29
 "All the Things She Said" (Extension 119 club edit) – 5:16
 "All the Things She Said" (video)
 "Behind the Scenes with Julia & Lena" (video)Australian and New Zealand CD single "All the Things She Said" (radio version)
 "All the Things She Said" (Mark!'s Intellectual vocal mix)
 "All the Things She Said" (Extension 119 club edit)
 "All the Things She Said" (HarDrum Remix)Japanese CD single'
 "All the Things She Said" (radio version) – 3:28
 "All the Things She Said" (Extension 119 club vocal) – 8:16
 "All the Things She Said" (Mark!'s Intellectual vocal) – 9:41
 "All the Things She Said" (Blackpulke Mix) – 4:13
 "All the Things She Said" (instrumental version) – 3:49

Charts

Weekly charts

Year-end charts

Decade-end charts

Certifications

Release history

See also
 All About Us (t.A.T.u. song)

Notes

References

External links
 
 

2000 debut singles
2000 songs
2000s in LGBT history
2002 singles
2003 singles
English-language Russian songs
European Hot 100 Singles number-one singles
Irish Singles Chart number-one singles
LGBT in Russia
Music video controversies
Number-one singles in Australia
Number-one singles in Austria
Number-one singles in the Czech Republic
Number-one singles in Denmark
Number-one singles in Germany
Number-one singles in Italy
Number-one singles in New Zealand
Number-one singles in Scotland
Number-one singles in Spain
Number-one singles in Switzerland
Poppy (entertainer) songs
Song recordings produced by Trevor Horn
Songs written by Elena Kiper
Songs written by Martin Kierszenbaum
Songs written by Sergio Galoyan
Songs written by Trevor Horn
Songs written by Valery Polienko
T.A.T.u. songs
UK Singles Chart number-one singles
Lesbian-related songs
Music videos shot in Russia